George Bennett (died 23 July 1880) was charged with the murder of George Brown, one of the Fathers of Confederation. He was convicted of this crime and hanged in Toronto, Ontario.

Background to armed confrontation with George Brown

Bennett had been an employee of the Toronto Globe where George Brown was founder and editor. He had been dismissed after repeated problems with drinking and general work habits. 

An armed confrontation with the editor ensued on 24 March 1880. This resulted in a bullet wound that became infected and led to Brown's death.

Execution of Bennett

After Brown had succumbed to his injuries seven weeks subsequent to Bennett's armed attack, Bennett was tried and hanged on conviction, a few weeks later.

See also

 George Brown %28Canadian politician%29#Legacy
 The Globe %28Toronto newspaper%29#History

References 
 Biography at the Dictionary of Canadian Biography Online

1880 deaths
Canadian people convicted of murder
Year of birth missing
Executed Canadian people
People executed by Canada by hanging
People convicted of murder by Canada

People executed for murder